Ureibacillus defluvii is a Gram-positive, thermophilic, rod-shaped and non-motile  bacterium from the genus of Ureibacillus.

References

Bacillales
Bacteria described in 2014